The University of Kentucky offers a variety of choices to students. The choices range from a number of dining options, residence halls, and athletic facilities to student organizations, religious groups, Greek-letter organizations, and intramural competitions/campus recreation.

Greek-letter organizations

Social organizations
There are 14 sororities and 25 fraternities that serve the University of Kentucky in Lexington.

Sororities

Fraternities

Honor societies
 Omicron Delta Kappa
 Alpha Psi Omega

Campus dining

There are also two convenience stores, located at Blazer Dining and at The 90.

The meal plans for on-campus students no longer utilize a declining-balance system, similar to a debit card. In 2005, a new "all care to eat" plan was initiated to the disfavor of 84.9% of the student body.  The cheapest meal plan for on-campus students is $949 per semester, extending upward to $2,013 per semester. These plans also include $300 in "flex dollars" which can be used at all on campus dining locations, convenience stores, and also Starbucks.

Students can also use their Plus Account to eat at a few select off-campus restaurants, such as McDonald's or Fazoli's.

The construction of The 90 was completed in 2015 by a design team which included Aramark, RossTarrant Architects (Architect of Record & Lead Project Manager) and Tipton Associates (dining services designer). The 82,000 square foot facility features seating for 1,000, including bar, family, traditional, active, indoor and outdoor seating, as well as student support spaces such as meeting spaces and technology-rich collaborative learning classrooms.

Religion and life-philosophy

Religious organizations
Listed below are some of the most popular, active, and/or relevant groups on the University of Kentucky's campus.  For a more complete list of registered religious student groups, refer to the University of Kentucky's Official Organization Database.

Jewish faith
 Chabad at UK/Chabad on Campus
 Jewish Student Organization/Hillel Foundation

Christian faith
 Baptist Campus Ministries
 Christian Student Fellowship (Christian churches and churches of Christ)
 Catholic Newman Center
 Fellowship of Catholic University Students
 Wesley Foundation

Islamic faith
 Muslim Student Association

Bahá'í faith
 Baha'i Association

Buddhism
 Buddhist Studies Group
 SGI Buddhist Student Association

Nearby places of worship

Non-religious philosophy groups
 Secular Student Alliance

Campus recreation

The university provides several facilities for unwinding from the daily campus grind. The Johnson Center, a  two-story structure located at South Campus, features basketball, volleyball, badminton, racketball, and wallyball courts, along with weight-lifting facilities, and rock climbing walls. It is also the home for some group fitness classes utilizing a large aerobics studio.

The Lancaster Aquatic Center, located next to the Johnson Center, opened in 1989 and features 10 lanes for lap swimming and has shallow space for other water activities.

The Seaton Center, now part of the Johnson Center, features facilities for basketball, volleyball, badminton, jogging, squash, table tennis, and racquetball.

In 2018, the north campus' first recreational facility in decades, Alumni Gym Fitness Center, opened as part of the Student Center expansion and renovation project. The facility is a major renovation of the historic Alumni Gymnasium, which had been home to UK men's basketball from 1924 to 1950.

Residence halls

Campus safety
The university has suffered from a perception that the campus is unsafe. In a survey of 1000 female university students, conducted in spring 2004, 36.5% reported having been victims of rape, stalking, or physical assault while at the campus. Campus law enforcement statistics do not bear out these numbers, however, and it can be assumed either that many serious crimes go unreported or that the survey conclusions were erroneous.

In response to the survey, University President Lee T. Todd, Jr. launched an initiative in September 2005 titled the Campus Safety Imperative, which included a quadrupling of annual expenditures on safety. Todd specifically linked campus safety to the goal of becoming a top-20 public research institution, stating that "We will never make gains toward becoming a top-20 public research institution if our students are unsafe or if they lack a sense of physical security. It is part of our fundamental mission, then, to create a campus that provides a safe place to live, to work, and to learn."

References

Student Life
K